The Flyweight competition was the second-lowest weight featured  at the 2009 World Amateur Boxing Championships, and was held at the Mediolanum Forum. Flyweights were limited to a maximum of 51 kilograms in body mass.

Medalists

Seeds

  Yampier Hernández (quarterfinals)
  Vincenzo Picardi (quarterfinals)
  Amnat Ruenroeng (quarterfinals)
   Thomas Essomba (first round)
  'McWilliams Arroyo  (champion)
  Braulio Ávila   (second round)
  Mumin Veli  (second round)
  Khalid Saeed Yafai (quarterfinals)

Draw

Finals

Top Half

Section 1

Section 2

Bottom Half

Section 3

Section 4

See also
Boxing at the 2008 Summer Olympics – Flyweight

External links
Draw

Flyweight